NGC 4262 is a lenticular galaxy located in the constellation of Coma Berenices.

Characteristics 
NGC 4262 is a small and compact barred lenticular galaxy with a high surface brightness central bar. It is a member of the Virgo Cluster at a distance from the Milky Way of around 50 million light-years.

It features an anomalous abundance of neutral hydrogen for a lenticular galaxy, most of it being located on a ring tilted with respect to NGC 4262's galactic plane.
Studies with help of the GALEX telescope have found within that ring several clusters of young stars that can be seen on ultraviolet images.

The aforementioned ring is believed to have its origin in NGC 4262 stripping some gas of another galaxy in a close passage, likely its neighbor the spiral Messier 99.

References

External links 
 

Lenticular galaxies
Barred lenticular galaxies
Virgo Cluster
Coma Berenices
4262
07365
039676
+03-31-101
J121930.57+145239.5
J12193058+1452396